Đura (also transliterated Djura) is a Serbian male given name derived from Đurađ (a Serbian variant of George).

It may refer to:
 Đura Dokić (1873–1946), a Serbian general, notable for being an Axis collaborator during World War II
 Đura Džudžar (born 1954), a eparchial bishop of the Greek Catholic Eparchy of Ruski Krstur since 2018
 Đura Sentđerđi (1900–1980) was a Yugoslav swimmer

See also 
 Georgije Đura Jakšić (1832–1878), a Serbian poet, painter, writer, dramatist and bohemian
 Đorđe Đura Horvatović (or Đorđe Đuro Horvatović; 1835–1895), a Serbian general and military minister
 Đuro, a South Slavic male given name
 Đurovac, a village in the municipality of Prokuplje, Serbia
 Đurović, a Serbian surname
 Đurić, a Serbian surname
 Đurovski or Ǵurovski, a South Slavic surname

Serbian masculine given names
Montenegrin masculine given names